Langston Moore (born July 17, 1981) is a former American football defensive tackle. He was drafted by the Cincinnati Bengals in the sixth round of the 2003 NFL Draft and also played for the Arizona Cardinals and the Detroit Lions.

Moore attended James Island Charter High School in Charleston, South Carolina, where he lettered in football and was a standout in Region AAAA play. He played college football with the University of South Carolina Gamecocks.

He joined the Gamecock IMG Sports Network in 2012 as the sideline reporter for football broadcasts.

His father was the Ft. Wayne WOWO Radio and Charleston radio personality, Ken Moore.

External links
Just Sports statistics
Cincinnati Bengals biography
Detroit Lions biography

1981 births
Living people
Sportspeople from Charleston, South Carolina
Players of American football from South Carolina
American football defensive tackles
South Carolina Gamecocks football players
Cincinnati Bengals players
Arizona Cardinals players
Detroit Lions players
Florida Tuskers players